Mark Antony Loveday (born 22 September 1943) is a British businessman, the senior partner of stockbrokers Cazenove from 1994 to 2001, and the chairman of Foreign & Colonial Investment Trust from 2002 to 2010.

Loveday was born on 22 September 1943, and educated at Winchester College, and Magdalen College, Oxford.

References

1943 births
British chief executives
Alumni of Magdalen College, Oxford
Living people
British Eurosceptics